Yakiv Federovych Barabash died in September 1658) was a Zaporozhian Cossack Otaman (1657–58) who opposed Hetman Ivan Vyhovsky.

In 1657 he and Poltava polkovnyk Martyn Pushkar led a pro-Muscovy revolt against Vyhovsky, who was generally pro-Polish in his policies. The revolt ended in June 1658 near Poltava, when Vyhovsky and his cossacks defeated the rebellion.  Barabash was later captured and executed.

References 
 
Ihor Pidkova (editor), Roman Shust (editor), "Dovidnyk z istorii Ukrainy", 3 Volumes, "(t. 3), Kiev, 1993-1999,  (t. 1),  (t. 2),  (t. 3). Article: Барабаш Яків 

17th-century Ukrainian people
1658 deaths
Zaporozhian Cossacks
Cossack rebels
Russian people of the Russo-Polish War (1654–1667)
18th-century executions
Year of birth unknown